Stella is an unincorporated community in Carteret County, North Carolina, United States.  The ZIP Code for Stella is 28582

References

External links

Unincorporated communities in North Carolina
Unincorporated communities in Carteret County, North Carolina
Populated coastal places in North Carolina